Félix Moati (born 24 May 1990) is a French actor, film director and screenwriter. He is the son of the journalist and filmmaker Serge Moati.

Filmography

As actor

As filmmaker

References

External links

 

1990 births
Living people
French male film actors
French male television actors
20th-century French male actors
21st-century French male actors
Male actors from Paris
French film directors
French male screenwriters
French screenwriters
French people of Tunisian-Jewish descent
Jewish French male actors